Lacoochee is a census-designated place (CDP) in Pasco County, Florida, United States.  The population was 1,345 at the 2000 census.

Geography
Lacoochee is located at  (28.463248, -82.171774).

Demographics

As of the census of 2000, there were 1,345 people, 417 households, and 321 families residing in the CDP. The racial makeup of the CDP was 60.59% White, 24.24% African American, 2.23% Native American, 0.07% Asian, 0.07% Pacific Islander, 9.74% from other races, and 3.05% from two or more races. Hispanic or Latino of any race were 37.55% of the population.

There were 417 households, out of which 47.7% had children under the age of 18 living with them, 47.0% were married couples living together, 20.6% had a female householder with no husband present, and 22.8% were non-families. 19.4% of all households were made up of individuals, and 6.2% had someone living alone who was 65 years of age or older.  The average household size was 3.23 and the average family size was 3.66.

In the CDP, the population was spread out, with 40.1% under the age of 18, 9.8% from 18 to 24, 26.1% from 25 to 44, 15.8% from 45 to 64, and 8.3% who were 65 years of age or older.  The median age was 25 years. For every 100 females, there were 103.2 males.  For every 100 females age 18 and over, there were 92.8 males.

The median income for a household in the CDP was $15,197, and the median income for a family was $16,553. Males had a median income of $40,300 versus $11,250 for females. The per capita income for the CDP was $6,780.  About 45.5% of families and 51.2% of the population were below the poverty line, including 57.4% of those under age 18 and 26.6% of those age 65 or over.

Notable person
Mudcat Grant, professional baseball player

References

External links
History of Lacoochee, Florida (Fivay.org)
Information on the Steering Committee for the Pasco County Lacoochee/Trilby Strategic Plan 2010

Census-designated places in Pasco County, Florida
Census-designated places in Florida